Emmanuelle Fontaine-Domeizel (born 28 August 1973) is a French nurse and politician of La République En Marche! (LREM) who was a Member of the National Assembly on 22 July 2017, representing Alpes-de-Haute-Provence's 2nd constituency from 2017 to 2020.

Early life and education 
Fontaine-Domeizel is the daughter of Claude Domeizel. She was a high-level basketball player. She is now a nurse.

Political career

Career in local politics 
After the departmental elections of 2015, Fontaine-Domeizel was elected departmental councilor of the Canton of Manosque-2 in tandem with Roland Aubert.

Member of the National Assembly 
Fontaine-Domeizel was the substitute for Christophe Castaner as member of the National Assembly for Alpes-de-Haute-Provence's 2nd constituency, and became the member following Castaner's appointment to the government on July 22, 2017.

In the National Assembly, Fontaine-Domeizel served on the Committee on Social Affairs. She was also a Vice President of the Information mission on the revision of the law on bioethics; the Hunting and territories' Working Group; and the France-Vietnam Friendship Group at the French National Assembly.

Fontaine-Domeizel was also a member of several Working Groups on health (End of life; Paramedical Professions; Health and Digital; Health at school).

She left the assembly when Castaner returned to the assembly in August 2020 and left LREM in October of that year.

Political positions
In July 2019, Fontaine-Domeizel voted in favor of the French ratification of the European Union’s Comprehensive Economic and Trade Agreement (CETA) with Canada.

See also
 2017 French legislative election

References

1973 births
Living people
Deputies of the 15th National Assembly of the French Fifth Republic
La République En Marche! politicians
21st-century French women politicians
People from Manosque
Departmental councillors (France)